The Churchville-Chili Central School District (CCCSD) is a public school district in Monroe County, New York, near Rochester. The district enrolls approximately 3,889 students in grades K-12 from the towns of Chili, Ogden, Riga, Sweden, and Churchville. District employees number 823 under an operating budget of $91,602,093 for the 2021-2022 school year.

Average class size is 19 to 24 students, and the student-teacher ratio is 11:1 for the elementary schools and 12:1 for the middle and high schools.

Schools and facilities
The CCCSD offers three elementary schools (K-4), one middle school (5-8), and a high school (10-12) with a ninth-grade subdivision. The six schools are on three campuses.  Additionally, the CCCSD operates a transportation facility. This facility transports over 4,200 students through the year to over 65 surrounding schools.

Board of Education
The CCCSD Board of Education consists of 10 members who serve on rotating three-year terms. Annual elections are held in May to select board members and vote on the budget.

Student performance
For the 2018-2019 school year, the CCCSD enrolled a total of 3,816 K-12 public school students. Student performance is measured according to New York State's standardized examinations including English Language Arts (ELA) in grades 3-8, Science in grades 4 and 8, and the Regents Exam for English, Math, Science, and Social Studies in high school.  These performance exams classify each student's performance as follows:  Level 1 - Not Proficient, Level 2 - Partially Proficient, Level 3 - Proficient, Level 4 - Advanced Proficient.  Students considered as proficient have tested at level 3 (proficient) and level 4 (advanced proficient).  The results below include the percent of students who achieved a 3 and 4 performance level for the 2018/19 school year.

Notable alumni

Renée Fleming, professional vocalist
Tim Redding (1996), professional baseball player

References

External links
Churchville-Chili Central School District web site
Great Schools - Schools in Churchville-Chili Central School District
New York State School Boards Association
Chestnut Ridge Elementary School website
www.niche.com/k12/d/churchville-chili-central-school-district-ny/

Education in Rochester, New York
School districts in New York (state)
Education in Monroe County, New York
School districts established in 1950